Søren Haagen Andreasen (born 26 March 1974) is a Danish handballer, currently playing for HØJ Elite.

References

External links
EHF Player Profile

1974 births
Living people
Danish male handball players
People from Esbjerg
SG Flensburg-Handewitt players
THW Kiel players
Sportspeople from the Region of Southern Denmark